Panama Hattie is a 1942 American film based upon the Broadway musical of the same name. It was produced by Arthur Freed and directed by Norman Z. McLeod.

Plot summary

Cast
 Red Skelton as Red
 Ann Sothern as Hattie Maloney
 Rags Ragland as Rags (as 'Rags' Ragland)
 Ben Blue as Rowdy
 Marsha Hunt as Leila Tree
 Virginia O'Brien as Flo Foster
 Alan Mowbray as Jay Jerkins, Dick's Butler
 Dan Dailey as Dick Bulliard (as Dan Dailey Jr.)
 Jackie Horner as Geraldine 'Gerry' Bulliard

Notes
Substantial retakes were directed by Roy Del Ruth with choreography by Danny Dare and musical numbers staged by Vincente Minnelli. The film used only four of Porter's songs and substituted other songs. The cast featured Red Skelton as Red, Ann Sothern as Hattie Maloney, Rags Ragland as Rags, Ben Blue as Rowdy, Marsha Hunt as Leila Tree, Virginia O'Brien as Flo Foster, Alan Mowbray as Jay Jerkins, Dan Dailey as Dick Bulliard and Lena Horne as Singer in Phil's Place.  Songs used in the film are as follows: 
 "Hattie from Panama" (Roger Edens) – Chorus
 "I've Still Got My Health" (Porter) – Ann Sothern
 "Berry Me Not" (Phil Moore) [instrumental, danced by the Berry Brothers]
 "Just One of Those Things" (Porter) – Lena Horne [from Jubilee]
 "Fresh As a Daisy" (Porter) – Virginia O'Brien
 "Good Neighbors" (Edens) – Red Skelton, Rags Ragland, Ben Blue and Chorus
 "Let's Be Buddies" (Porter) – Sothern with Jackie Horner, and O'Brien with Alan Mowbray
 "Hail, Hail, the Gang's All Here" (Arthur Sullivan; Theodore F. Morse) [instrumental]
 "Did I Get Stinkin' At the Savoy" (E. Y. Harburg and Walter Donaldson) – O'Brien
 "The Sping" (Moore and J. LeGon) – Horne [danced by the Berry Brothers]
 "The Son of a Gun Who Picks on Uncle Sam" (Harburg and Burton Lane) – Company

Reception
According to MGM records the film earned $1,798,000 in the US and Canada, $528,000 elsewhere, making the studio a profit of $474,000.

References

External links

 
 
 
 

1942 films
1942 musical films
American black-and-white films
American musical films
Films directed by Norman Z. McLeod
Metro-Goldwyn-Mayer films
Films set in Panama
1940s American films